Sir Colin Percy Farquharson Rimer (born 30 January 1944) is a former judge of the English Court of Appeal; he retired in 2014.

Education
He was educated at Dulwich College from 1954 to 1962 and at Trinity Hall, Cambridge.

Legal career
Rimer was called to the bar (Lincoln’s Inn) in 1968 and made a Bencher in 1994. He was appointed a Queen's Counsel in 1988. He was appointed a Justice of the High Court on 3 October 1994 and was assigned to the Chancery Division. On 1 October 2007, he became a Lord Justice of Appeal, on the retirement of Robin Auld. He retired on 7 October 2014.

Cases
Hunter v Moss [1994] 1 WLR 452 (overturned on reasoning)
Gencor ACP Ltd v Dalby [2000] 2 BCLC 734
Sinclair Investment Holdings SA v Versailles Trade Finance (No. 3) [2007] EWHC 915 
Consistent Group Ltd v Kalwak [2008] EWCA Civ 430 (reversed by Autoclenz Ltd v Belcher [2011] UKSC 41)
Moore Stephens v Stone Rolls Ltd [2008] EWCA Civ 644
Chartbrook Ltd v Persimmon Homes Ltd [2008] EWCA Civ 183 (overturned)
Re Sigma Finance Corporation [2008] EWCA Civ 1303
Revenue and Customs Commissioners v Annabel’s (Berkeley Square) Ltd [2009] EWCA Civ 361
O'Donnell v Shanahan [2009] EWCA Civ 751
Williams v British Airways plc [2009] EWCA Civ 281 (overturned) 
Parkwood Leisure Ltd v Alemo-Herron [2010] EWCA Civ 24
Jones v Kernott [2010] EWCA Civ 578 (overturned)
Revenue and Customs Commissioners v Banerjee [2011] 1 WLR 702
Petrodel Resources Ltd v Prest [2012] EWCA Civ 1395 (overturned)
Hounga v Allen [2014] UKSC 47 (overturned)
Home Office v Essop [2017] UKSC 27 (overturned)

Arms

References

External links
Judiciary.gov.uk

1944 births
Living people
Chancery Division judges
20th-century English judges
Knights Bachelor
Lords Justices of Appeal
Members of the Privy Council of the United Kingdom
People educated at Dulwich College
21st-century English judges